Eva Rothschild RA (born 1971) is an Irish artist based in London.

Eva Rothschild was born in Dublin, Ireland. She received a BA in Fine Art from the University of Ulster, Belfast (1990–93), and an MA in Fine Art from Goldsmiths College, London (1997–99). Her work is predominantly sculptural and she works across a range of materials including aluminium, jesmonite, leather, fabric and perspex. She has a materials based studio practice but also works on major public and outdoor commissions. Her work references the art movements of the 1960s and 1970s, such as Minimalism and is also informed by the contemporary aesthetics of protest and spirituality. In 2014 she was elected Royal Academician.

Rothschild's work has been the subject of institutional solo exhibitions including Australian Centre for Contemporary Art (2018), Dublin City Gallery, the Hugh Lane (2014), Nasher Sculpture Center (2012), The Hepworth Wakefield (2011), South London Gallery (2007), and Kunsthalle Zürich (2004). In 2009 she was awarded the Tate Britain annual Duveens' Commission, for which she produced Cold Corners, a vast rambling geometric sculpture that occupied the length of the neo-classical galleries.

Rothschild's works are held by major public collections including MoMA, New York, Arts Council of England, Irish Museum of Modern Art, Dublin, Tate, and the Walker Art Center, Minneapolis.

In 2019, she represented Ireland at the 58th Venice Biennale.

Exhibitions

Solo exhibitions
2020
 The Shrinking Universe, Ireland Pavilion, 58th International Art Exhibition, La Biennale di Venezia Touring Show, VISUAL Carlow, Irish Museum of Modern Art, Dublin.
2019
 Furniture, Tapestry and Ceramics, Blue Mountain School, London
 The Shrinking Universe, curated by Mary Cremin, Ireland Pavilion, 58th International Art Exhibition – La Biennale di Venezia, Venice, Italy
 Kosmos, City Gallery Wellington, Wellington, New Zealand
2018
 Kosmos, Australian Centre for Contemporary Art (ACCA), Melbourne, Australia 
 "Iceberg Hits", Modern Art, London
2017
 Kaufmann Repetto, Milan, Italy
 A Material Enlightenment, 303 Gallery, New York, NY, USA
 City Room (with Gary Webb), Galeria Mário Sequeira, Parada de Tibães, Portugal
2016
 Alternative to Power, New Art Gallery Walsall, Walsall
 A Gated Community, Sonneveld House, Rotterdam, Netherlands
2015
 Middle Temple, Kaufmann Repetto, Milan, Italy
2014
 Dublin City Gallery, The Hugh Lane, Dublin, Ireland, 2014
 "What the Eye Wants", Modern Art, London
 This and This and This, Art Parcours, Art 45 Basel, Basel, Switzerland
2013
 Narcissus, Galerie Eva Presenhuber, Zürich, Switzerland 
 "New Sculpture", New Art Centre, Wiltshire, 2014
2012
 The Douglas Hyde Gallery, Dublin, Ireland, 2012
 Sightings, Nasher Sculpture Centre, Dallas, TX, USA
 Childrens Art Commission: Eva Rothschild: Boys and Sculpture, The Whitechapel Gallery, London 
 The Modern Institute, Glasgow, Scotland
2011
 Hot Touch, Kunstverein Hannover, Hanover, Germany 
 303 Gallery, New York, NY, USA, 2011
 Hot Touch, The Hepworth Wakefield, Wakefield Empire Public Art Fund, New York, NY, USA
2009
 Cold Corners, Tate Britain Annual Duveens’ Commission, Tate Britain, London 
 Modern Art, London, 2009
 Francesca Kaufmann, Milan, Italy, 2009
 Galerie Eva Presenhuber, Zürich, Switzerland, 2009
 La Conservera: Centro de Arte Contemporaneo, Murcia, Spain, 2009
2008
 The Modern Institute, Glasgow, Scotland 
 Tate Britain, London
2007
 South London Gallery, London, 2007
 303 Gallery, New York, NY, USA, 2007
2006
 Galerie Eva Presenhuber, Zürich, Switzerland
2005
 Modern Art, London, 2005
 Douglas Hyde Gallery, Dublin, Ireland
2004
 Kunsthalle, Zürich, Switzerland Artspace, Sydney, Australia, 2004
2003
 Heavy Cloud, The Modern Institute, Glasgow, Scotland, 2003
 "Sit-In", Galleria Francesca Kaufmann, Milan, Italy, 2003
2002
 Modern Art, London, 2002
 Project Art Centre, Dublin, Ireland, 2002
2001
 Peacegarden, The Showroom, London 
 Peacegarden, Cornerhouse, Manchester
 Francesca Kauffman Gallery, Milan, Italy 
 Els Hanappe Underground, Athens, Greece
2000
 Camden Arts Centre, London
1999
 The Modern Institute, Glasgow, Scotland
1998
 Titanik Galerie, Turku, Finland
1996
 Great Wall / Black Hole, Iain Irving Projects, Aberdeenshire 
 Centre for Contemporary Art, Glasgow
1995
 Bercsenyi Galleria, Budapest, Hungary

Selected collections

Aïshti Foundation, Antelias, Lebanon
Arts Council Collection, London
Berezdivin Collection, Santurce, Puerto Rico British Council, London
Carnegie Museum of Art, Pittsburgh, PA, USA Cass Sculpture Foundation, Goodwood
Cloud Art Space, Seoul, South Korea
Dallas Museum of Art, Dallas, TX, USA
Dublin City Gallery, The Hugh Lane, Dublin, Ireland
The Goss-Michael Foundation, Dallas, TX, USA
The Hepworth Wakefield, Wakefield
Irish Museum of Modern Art, Dublin, Ireland
Israel Museum, Jerusalem, Israel
Leeds City Council, Leeds
The Museum of Modern Art, New York, NY, USA
Museum Voorlinden, Waasenaar, Netherlands
New Art Centre, Salisbury, Wiltshire
Norwich Castle Museum & Art Gallery, Norwich, Norfolk
Pier Arts Centre, Stromness, Orkney
Pilane Heritage Museum, Klövedal, Sweden
Pizzuti Collection of the Columbus Museum of Art, Columbus, OH, USA Sammlung Goetz, Munich, Germany
Southampton City Art Gallery, Southampton
Swiss Re Art Collection, Zürich, Switzerland
Tate, London
TBA21 – Thyssen-Bornemisza Art Contemporary, Vienna, Austria Walker Art Center, Minneapolis, MN, USA
Würth Collection, Schwäbisch Hall, Germany
Zabludowicz Collection, London

References

External links

 Public Art Fund Eva Rothschild "Empire"
Eva Rothschild information at 303 Gallery
2006 Tate Triennial
Rothschild on ArtFacts.net
Images, texts and biography from the Saatchi Gallery
 Profile on Royal Academy of Arts Collections

1972 births
Living people
Irish contemporary artists
Irish Jews
Royal Academicians